Nurse with Wound (abbreviated NWW) is the main recording name for British musician Steven Stapleton. Nurse with Wound was originally a band, formed in 1978 by Stapleton, John Fothergill and Heman Pathak. The band's work has explored genres such as industrial, noise, dark ambient, and drone.

Musical output
Their early recordings, all made quickly, were heavily influenced by free improvisation and krautrock and were generally considered industrial music, despite the objections of the group.

By 1981, only Stapleton was left from the original trio and he now regards 1982's Homotopy to Marie as being the first proper Nurse with Wound release. There are now over 40 full length NWW titles. Stapleton's fondness for dada, surrealism and absurdist humor are demonstrated in much of NWW's output, which, though it draws directly on a wide assortment of genres (including cabaret music, nursery rhymes, John Cage, The Beach Boys, krautrock, ambient music, and easy listening), retains a distinctive and recognizable aura. Musique concrète may be the most prominent touchstone due to Stapleton's frequent, and often humorous, use of creative tape loops and editing. This aesthetic is fully represented in the artwork on the album covers, virtually all of which are created by Stapleton, mostly under the pseudonym "Babs Santini".

Members
Although Stapleton has sole curatorship of NWW, the group has a long list of collaborators including Diana Rogerson, James Thirlwell of Foetus, Tony Wakeford, David Jackman of Organum, Andrew McKenzie of The Hafler Trio, Stereolab, Jim O'Rourke, Christoph Heemann, William Bennett of Whitehouse, Robert Haigh, Rose McDowall of Strawberry Switchblade, Annie Anxiety, John Balance of Coil, Matt Waldron of Irr. App (Ext), and most regularly David Tibet of Current 93. For some time, NWW was a core duo of Stapleton and Colin Potter, the latter having first worked with NWW on 1992's "Thunder Perfect Mind" when it was recorded at Potter's ICR studio. Potter has appeared on almost every NWW release since 1992. In 2009, a CD titled "Ød Lot" was released (credited to Nurse With Wound) which contained solo recordings by Stapleton, Potter, Waldron and Andrew Liles.

Current work (2005–present)
In 2005, the band returned to live performance after a 21-year absence. Stapleton, Potter, Waldron, Rogerson and Andrew Liles played three concerts at the Narrenturm in Vienna, where they performed improvisations on the album Salt Marie Celeste. These concerts were not billed as NWW appearances. The first official NWW appearances since 1984 were at the Great American Music Hall in San Francisco in June 2006. In December of the same year, the group played at the All Tomorrow's Parties festival organized by Thurston Moore. During 2007, Stapleton gigged and DJed with much greater regularity, including a set at experimental music night Stress!! in Galway City, Ireland and full live NWW sets is in Austria, Belgium, France, Barcelona, London, Moscow, Berlin and Venice.

A collaborative work with krautrock band Faust was released on CD in 2007 as Disconnected with a vinyl edition carrying additional mixes following in 2008. Nurse recently joined Faust for the encores during the concert at St. John in Hackney. A NWW album entitled Huffin' Rag Blues, primarily a collaboration with British sound artist Andrew Liles, was issued in 2008 with a companion mini-LP entitled The Bacteria Magnet. A remix of Sunn O)))'s ØØ Void entitled The Iron Soul of Nothing was given a limited release with an expanded reissue of the out-of-print studio album The Man with the Woman Face following. An album of new material entitled The Surveillance Lounge was then released as a CD with a limited triple CD called The Memory Surface. A CD of new material entitled Space Music will be released on 17 November 2009.

A recent collaboration was a result of the chance meeting of Nurse With Wound's Steven Stapleton and Graham Bowers, both artists were appearing at Bangor Sound City's first art/sound event 'Wet Sounds' curated by Joel Cahen located at the Bangor Swimming Pool, North Wales, in January 2011. Both were admirers of each other's past works and felt that a collaboration on a new piece of work could be an interesting and exciting prospect; consequently Rupture was the first full-length work, and was released as a double vinyl album/LP, a CD and download. The vinyl album and CD have been released through Dirter.

They followed up to Rupture with Parade, which was released on the interdisciplinary arts group/record label Red Wharf and distributed by Cargo.  The third collaboration, ExcitoToxicity, was released July 2014, and the fourth, Mutation released in March 2015 all through Red Wharf and distributed by Cargo.

Discography 
(selected; a full discography can be obtained from the official website—see links below)

All records released on United Dairies, except where indicated.

Albums

 Chance Meeting on a Dissecting Table of a Sewing Machine and an Umbrella (1979), United Dairies (expanded, anniversary edition issued on World Serpent/United Dairies, 2001)
 To the Quiet Men from a Tiny Girl (1980), United Dairies
 Merzbild Schwet (1980), United Dairies
 Insect and Individual Silenced (1981), United Dairies
 Homotopy to Marie (1982), United Dairies (augmented re-release double-album by Rotorelief, 2018)
 Ostranenie 1913 (1983), Third Mind Records
 Brained by Falling Masonry (1984), L.A.Y.L.A.H. Antirecords
 The Sylvie and Babs Hi-Fi Companion (1985), L.A.Y.L.A.H. Antirecords (reissued by United Dairies, 1995)
 Spiral Insana (1986), Torso (re-released on United Dairies, 1997, augmented re-release double-album by Rotorelief, 2016)
 Automating Volume One (1986), United Dairies
 Scrag! (1987), United Dairies
 Drunk with the Old Man of the Mountains (1987)
 Alas the Madonna Does Not Function (1988), 12″ EP on United Dairies
 Noise War 4 (1988, record 1979), Kas
 Soliloquy for Lilith (1988), 3×LP set on Idle Hole (re-released on 2×CD by United Dairies, 1993, on 3×CD in 2003 and finally, again on 3×CD by United Jnana, 2005)
 Soliloquy for Lilith [Parts 5 and 6] (1989)
 A Sucked Orange (1990)
 Thunder Perfect Mind (1992), United Dairies
 Large Ladies With Cake in the Oven (1993), United Dairies
 Rock 'n Roll Station (1994)
 Who Can I Turn to Stereo (1996)
 An Awkward Pause (1999)
 Alice the Goon (second edition) (2000), release with a bonus track of a 1996 vinyl-only issue of 500 copies
 Funeral Music for Perez Prado (2001), compilation featuring extended versions of previously released tracks
 Man with the Woman Face (2002)
 Salt Marie Celeste (2003)
 She and Me Fall Together in Free Death (2003), Beta-lactam Ring Records
 The Musty Odour of Pierced Rectums (2003), very limited edition on Beta-lactam Ring Records
 Chance Meeting of a Defective Tape Machine and a Migraine (2003), remixes
 Shipwreck Radio Volume One (2004), ICR (special edition with extra disc Lofoten Deadhead)
 Echo Poeme: Sequence No. 2 (2005), United Jnana
 Shipwreck Radio Volume Two (2005), ICR (special edition with extra disc Gulls Just Wanna Have Fun)
 Soundpooling (2006), ICR (special edition with extra disc A Hand Job for the Laughing Policeman)
 Stereo Wastelands (2006), Beta-lactam Ring Records (edition of 500 CDs compiling previously unreleased mixes from Who Can I Turn to Stereo?)
 Rat Tapes One: An Accumulation of Discarded Musical Vermin 1983–2006 (2006)
 Shipwreck Radio: The Final Broadcasts (2006), ICR
 Huffin' Rag Blues (2008), United Dairies/Jnana
 The Surveillance Lounge (2009), United Dirter
 Space Music (2009), Beta-lactam Ring Records
 Paranoia in HiFi (2009), Dirtier Promotions (compilation featuring excerpts of previously released tracks)
 Chromanatron (2013), Rotorelief
 Dark Fat (2016), United Dirter
 Sombrero Fallout (2017), self-released live album
Nerve Junction (2018), self-released (Limited Edition)

Collaborative albums

 The 150 Murderous Passions with Whitehouse (1981), Come Organisation
 In Fractured Silence (1984), United Dairies
 Nylon Coverin' Body Smotherin'  with Current 93 (1984), Mi Mort
 A Missing Sense/Rasa with Organum (1986)
 Nurse With Wound and The Hafler Trio Hit Again! with The Hafler Trio (1987), Staalplaat
 Crumb Duck with Stereolab (1993), Clawfist, edition of 1450 (expanded reissue on United Dairies, 1997)
 Acts of Senseless Beauty with Aranos (1997)
 Simple Headphone Mind with Stereolab (1997), Duophonic
 The Swinging Reflective: Favourite Moments of Mutual Ecstasy (1999), collaborations 1980–1999, on United Dairies
 Angry Electric Finger (2004), 5 releases—one disc each in collaboration with Jim O'Rourke, Cyclobe, and IrrAppExt, a vinyl-only release of the source material, and a disc of outtakes on United Dairies; all other editions on Beta-lactam Ring Records)
 Disconnected with Faust (2007)
 The Iron Soul of Nothing (2008) (second disc of the reissue of Sunn O)))'s album ØØ Void, this additional CD being a Nurse with Wound remix labeled "Sunn O))) meets Nurse with Wound")
 Erroneous: A Selection of Errors (2010), collaborative work with German avant-gardist Fritz Mueller and Italian industrial band Larsen.
 Rupture (2012), Dirter, collaborative work with Graham Bowers
 Parade (2013), Red Wharf, collaborative work with Graham Bowers
 ExcitoToxicity (2014), Red Wharf, collaborative work with Graham Bowers
 Mutation (2015), Red Wharf, collaborative work with Graham Bowers

See also
Nurse with Wound list

References

External links
 Official website
 Nurse with Wound at Brainwashed
 Nurse with Wound at Bandcamp
 
 
 Nurse with Wound at Beta-lactam Ring Records Shop
 Nurse With Wound and Graham Bowers at Red Wharf

English experimental musical groups
British industrial music groups
Musical groups established in 1979
Dark ambient music groups
Musical groups from London
Third Mind Records artists